The fourth series of The Great British Bake Off began airing on 20 August 2013. Mel Giedroyc and Sue Perkins again presented the show and Mary Berry and Paul Hollywood returned as judges. As with series three, the competition was held at Harptree Court in East Harptree, Somerset.

13,000 amateur bakers applied to appear on the programme, and 100 were selected for screen test, with the best 60 advancing to a three-day audition. From these, 13 contestants were chosen this year so the judges could eliminate two people whenever they wanted.

The winner of the Great British Bake Off 2013 was Frances Quinn.

The fourth series was broadcast as the second season on PBS in the United States.

Bakers

Results summary 

Colour key:

Episodes

Episode 1: Cakes 
The bakers were given two hours to make a sandwich cake with filling of their choice for the signature challenge. For their first technical challenge, the bakers were required to bake an angel food cake using Mary Berry's recipe in two and half hours. For the showstopper, the challenge was to make a chocolate cake using at least two types of chocolate to decorate the cake.  They were given four hours for this bake.

Episode 2: Bread 
The bakers were asked to make, in two hours, 36 breadsticks, all made using yeast, of at least 25 cm (10 inches) in length, and the breadsticks should be crisp and produce a good snap. For the technical challenge, the bakers have to make eight English muffins using Paul's recipe in 2¾ hours. For the final bake, an elaborately decorated loaf was set as the showstopper challenge to be completed in four hours.

Episode 3: Desserts 
For the first challenge of the episode the bakers were asked to make a trifle of their own choice, using ladyfingers, sponge or biscuit for the base and either jam or custard for the middle layer. For their second challenge, the bakers were required to prepare, in an hour and a half, 6 floating islands using Mary Berry's recipe. For the show-stopper, the bakers were set the task of making 24 petit fours, twelve biscuit based, twelve sponge based, to be finished in three hours.

In this challenge, Deborah accidentally used Howard's custard. As a result, Howard used Deborah's custard in his trifle. This switch was revealed to Paul and Mary, who appropriately judged their custards separately in their respective trifles. The incident was dubbed Custardgate by the press.

Episode 4: Pies and Tarts 
For the signature challenge the bakers are asked to bake a double-crusted fruit pie with a filling of their choice. For their fourth technical challenge, the bakers were required to bake a tart that has almost a 700-year history; the egg custard tart. For the showstopper, the challenge was to make a filo pie centrepiece using the filo pastry that they had made from scratch.

Episode 5: Biscuits and Traybakes 
For the signature challenge, the bakers were asked to make their favourite traybake in two hours and cut into identical pieces. Everything made as part of the traybake, however, needed to be made from scratch. In the technical challenge, the bakers needed to make 18 tuiles using Mary's recipe in one and a half hours. Half of the tuiles needed to be shaped in the traditional manner and piped in a concentric circle, and the other half rolled up and dipped in chocolate. In the last challenge, the baker had to make a biscuit tower at least 30 cm high, to be finished in four hours.

During the Showstopper round, Frances's tower tipped over while Mel was helping her measure it.

Episode 6: Sweet Dough 
In the first challenge, the bakers were required to make a sweet tea loaf using yeast, either in a tin or free form. They were given 3 hours for the task. For the technical challenge, the bakers baked an apricot couronne using Paul's recipe in two and three-quarter hours. For the showstopper, the bakers needed to make two different varieties of European sweet buns, 12 of each. The bakers were given 30 minutes to start in the first day so that dough may be proofed overnight, to be finished the second day in four hours.

Episode 7: Pastry 
The bakers are challenged to bring the old fashioned suet pudding back up to date for the signature challenge. In the technical bake, the bakers are challenged to create eight perfect religieuse: choux buns topped with ganache and filled with crème patissiere then carefully balanced one on top of the other. In the showstopper challenge, the bakers have four hours to make three different types of puff pastries: one must be filled, another has to be iced and the final one is of their choice.

Episode 8: Alternative Ingredients 
This week, in the quarter final, the theme for this week were bakes that were free (e.g. gluten free, dairy free). In the signature challenge, the bakers are challenged to bake a loaf that does not use traditional wheat flours, instead they must use flours such as spelt, rye, potato or tapioca. The bakers are challenged in the technical bake to make a dacquoise which consists of three layers; coiled meringue, coffee custard and a hazelnut praline top. For the showstopper, the bakers are pushed out of their comfort zones and asked to create novelty vegetable cakes which must be dairy free.

Episode 9: French week (Semi-final) 
This week's theme was all things French. In the signature challenge, the bakers are challenged to make three different types of savoury canapés; choux pastry, shortcrust or rough puff pastry, and a third pastry of their choice. For the technical bake, the bakers are challenged to make a Charlotte Royale consisting of Swiss roll surrounding a bavarois. It is set with gelatin to form a firm dome when turned out. In the showstopper challenge, the bakers are challenged to bake an iconic French patisserie, the opera cake.

Episode 10: Final 
In the signature challenge, the final three are challenged to create a picnic pie. The pie must be savoury, the fillings have to create a creative design and has to be strong enough to be served out of the tin. For the technical challenge, the bakers are challenged to make 12 perfectly shaped pretzels; six savoury with rock salt and six sweet, flavoured with poppy seeds and topped with sweet orange zest and glaze. For the final showstopper challenge of the series, the bakers are asked to bake the ultimate showpiece – a three-tiered wedding cake.

Masterclasses 
Mary and Paul take over the tent and take on the challenges that they set for the bakers, showing what they would have done had they been in the bakers shoes.

Episode 1

Episode 2

Episode 3

Episode 4

Christmas Masterclass

Controversy
Before the series started, there was speculation Paul Hollywood would not appear in the show after his marriage broke down. Mary Berry, however, was claimed to have supported Hollywood over rumours of his possible sacking by BBC; and the BBC denied the rumours and said that his job was safe.

During the series, there were accusations of Paul Hollywood's favouritism towards Ruby Tandoh, and personal attacks on Tandoh by various people including the chef Raymond Blanc. Both Paul Hollywood and Ruby Tandoh denied the accusation.

Post-show careers
Frances Quinn wrote a book, Quinntessential Baking, released on 17 August 2015.

Ruby Tandoh has written three books, Crumb: The Baking Book, published on 25 September 2014, Flavour: Eat What You Love in 2016 and Eat Up: Food, Appetite and Eating What You Want in 2018.  She took half a year out from the university after the show, but has returned to complete her philosophy and history of art course at University College London. She wrote a column on baking for The Guardian.

Beca Lyne-Pirkis presented a Welsh language cookery show Becws for S4C starting 11 September 2014.

Glenn Cosby left teaching and launched his own touring stage show Bake It Big in 2014. That same year, Cosby release his book Tasty Travels.

Ali Imdad has set up a bakery business, and become a full-time baker.

Ratings
The show achieved some of the highest ratings seen on BBC Two. According to overnight data, the final episode was seen by 9.1 million viewers at its peak, and averaging over 8 million, more than twice the number of viewers on BBC One and ITV.  This episode is the highest-rated show ever on BBC2 under the ratings system first introduced in 2002, beating the previous record set by an episode of Top Gear in 2007.  Series 4 had an average of viewing figure of 7.4 million.

Official episode viewing figures are from BARB.

Specials

References

External links
 
Official Site

Series 4
2013 British television seasons